Michael Moriarty (born 1941) is an American-Canadian actor.

Michael Moriarty is also the name of:
 Michael Moriarty (judge) (born 1946), Irish judge who chaired the Moriarty Tribunal into payment to politicians Charles Haughey and Michael Lowry
 Michael Moriarty (historian), British historian
 Michael Moriarty (politician), South African politician from Gauteng
 Michael Moriarty (author) (born 1954), General Secretary of Education and Training Boards Ireland
 Michael Moriarty, bass guitarist for the band Hey Monday
 Mick Moriarty, Australian musician
 Mike Moriarty (born 1974), baseball player
 Mícheál Ó Muircheartaigh (born 1930), Irish broadcaster, born Michael Moriarty